Gabriel Steiner (26 May 1883, Ulm – 10 August 1965, Detroit) was a German-American neurologist known for his research of multiple sclerosis. In his studies, he postulated a link between multiple sclerosis and certain forms of spirochetes.

Of Jewish ancestry, he studied medicine at the universities of Munich, Würzburg, Freiburg and Strasbourg, receiving his doctorate at the latter university in 1910. In 1913 he qualified as a lecturer in neurology and psychiatry, and from 1920, worked as an associate professor at the University of Heidelberg. Here, he was also head of the laboratory for pathological anatomy at the psychiatric-neurological clinic.

In 1936 he emigrated to the United States, where from 1937 to 1954, he served as a professor of neurology and neuropathology at Wayne State University School of Medicine in Detroit. In retirement, he was director of the Michigan Multiple Sclerosis Center.

Publications 
Works published in English:
 Multiple sclerosis. J Mich State Med Soc. 1950 Aug; 49(8):938-40.
 Experimental allergic encephalomyelitis, spontaneous demyelinating disease and multiple sclerosis. Gaz Med Port. 1951; 4(3):824-34.
 Environmental studies in multiple sclerosis. Neurology. 1952 May-Jun; 2(3):260-2
 Acute plaques in multiple sclerosis, their pathogenetic significance and the role of spirochetes as etiological factor. J Neuropathol Exp Neurol. 1952 Oct; 11(4):343-72
 Morphology of Spirochaeta myelophthora in multiple sclerosis. J Neuropathol Exp Neurol. 1954 Jan; 13(1):221-9.
 Comparison of general paresis and multiple sclerosis in regard to the etiological agent. J Neuropathol Exp Neurol. 1954 Jul; 13(3):492-6.
Works published in German:
 Epilepsie und Gliom, 1910 (dissertation thesis)
 Klinik der Neurosyphilis. In: Handbuch der Haut- und Geschlechtskrankheiten, volume 17, 1; Berlin, 1929. 
 Multiple und diffuse Sklerose. In: Handbuch der Gesisteskrankheiten, volume 11; Berlin, 1930. 
 Krankheitserreger und Gewebsbefund bei multipler Sklerose. Berlin, 1930. 
 Die körperlichen Erscheinungen. with Alfred A. Strauss (1897-1957). 
 Anatomisches. In: Handbuch der Gesisteskrankheiten, volume 9; Berlin, 1932.
 Multiple Sklerose, ihre Ätiologie, Pathologie, Pathogenese und Therapie, 1962.

References 

1883 births
1965 deaths
People from Ulm
Academic staff of Heidelberg University
University of Strasbourg alumni
Jewish emigrants from Nazi Germany to the United States
German neurologists
American neurologists